Mary Patterson (1927–2016) was an American singer and politician.

Mary Patterson may also refer to:
Mary Patterson Clark (born 1936), Canadian architect
Mary Jane Patterson (1840– 1894), first African-American woman to receive a B.A degree
Mary Michael Patterson, American theater actress and singer
Mary Paterson (1864–1941), British factory inspector and philanthropist
Mary Baker Eddy (1821–1910), American religious leader known for a short time as Mary Patterson

See also
Mary A. Patterson Memorial, memorial to the wife of Monroe Patterson